Keep It in the Family is an American television game show hosted by Bill Nimmo (Keefe Brasselle hosted the pilot) and announced by Johnny Olson which ran on ABC from October 12, 1957 to February 8, 1958.

The series was created by Leonard Stern and Roger Price and was produced by Frank Cooper Productions. It was replaced by Dick Clark's Beechnut Show, which ran until 1960.

Gameplay
A sort of forerunner of Family Feud, the game involved two five-member teams of families, each starting the game with 200 points. In each round, the teams were shown a prize, after which they were given a category and then alternated bidding for control. The difficulty of the question also increased with the amount of the bid. Bidding was played as an auction until one team either challenged their opponents or bid the 100 point maximum.

The winning bid team was then asked a five-part question, with the youngest members generally getting the easier question parts and the older members getting the difficult parts. When a family answered all five parts of the question correctly, they received the amount of their bid plus the prize; if, however, a team missed any part of the question, the amount of their bid was deducted from their score.

The game continued until one team scored 350 points and won the game. However, if a team's score fell below 100 points, that team automatically lost. The winners then faced a new family. Regardless of the outcome, all teams kept whatever prizes they won during their stay.

Episode status
The series is believed to have been destroyed as per network practices of the era. Only the premiere is known to exist and has been seen on the internet.

Foreign Version
In the United Kingdom, a version was broadcast on ITV in 1958. The host for this version was actor Bill Owen, who would later star in the BBC sitcom Last of the Summer Wine.

References
 David Schwartz, Steve Ryan, and Fred Wostbrock; "The Encyclopedia of TV Game Shows," 3rd edition, 1999.
 Tim Brooks and Earle Marsh, "The Complete Directory of Prime Time Television," various editions, 1978–present.

External links
 Keep It in the Family on IMDb

American Broadcasting Company original programming
1950s American game shows
1957 American television series debuts
1958 American television series endings
1950s British game shows
Lost television shows